Fun with Radio is a book by Gilbert Davey first published in 1957 by Edmund Ward Ltd (London). At a time when radio receivers were still very expensive, and portable radios still a rarity (transistors were just being introduced), the book introduced many youngsters, mainly boys, to radio construction, and in some cases a career in radio or electronics. Radio construction was, in the early years of broadcasting, a very popular hobby among boys. By the time he published 'Fun with Radio', Davey already had a huge following among readers of the Boy's Own Paper, where he was said to be the most popular contributor on practical subjects among its readers, and in that same year he presented a series on BBC Television's Studio 'E''' which reportedly brought him 26,000 letters within a few days of the first broadcast 

Gilbert Davey had a career as an insurance official, and was an amateur in the field of radio, but his enthusiasm and straightforward writing with clear detailed diagrams inspired many youngsters.

Six editions of the book were published, the final one in 1978.  Davey also wrote Fun with Short Wave Radio, Fun with Transistors, Fun with Hi-Fi, and Fun with Silicon Chips in Modern Radio'' (1981).

References 

1957 children's books
Children's non-fiction books
Technical books
Handbooks and manuals
British children's books